The Taiwanese Cultural Association (TCA) was an important organization during the Japanese rule of Taiwan. It was founded by Chiang Wei-shui on 17 October 1921, in Daitōtei, a district in modern-day Taipei.

History
After World War I, an epidemic of self-determination and democracy engulfed the world. Needless to say, Taiwan was also inundated with this new sense of independence. Inspired by the Samil Movement in Korea in 1919, Taiwanese college students in Japan further developed their craving for an independent Taiwan.

At that time, only affluent Taiwanese families could send their children to Japanese universities. Most of these children were born and raised during Japanese colonization of Taiwan. Therefore, they were taught using Japanese methods and customs quite different from the education of their parents, a formal Chinese education teaching strictly traditions and ancient philosophies. In Japan, Taiwanese students underwent extreme racism from not only Japanese students but also their friends and relatives. When improperly treated by the Japanese (e.g. being called ), these students would often search for methods of circumventing trouble. Due to these actions, though, they were often taunted by Korean students for not fighting for their own rights.

Japan
Japan was not only the hub of advanced learning for Taiwanese students, but also an excellent opportunity to learn revolutionary ideas such as equality for all people and freedom, options that the oppressive Japanese Regime would not allow. This was where intellectuals adopted new and more innovated ideas in order to gain either independence or autonomy for Taiwan. These intellectuals often held conferences discussing beneficial possibilities. They petitioned the Japanese government to permit the enactment of a representative committee which spoke in favor of Taiwanese people, thus taking a vital step towards democracy. The committee, established in 1921, was called the Petition Movement for the Establishment of a Taiwanese Parliament. Lin Hsien-tang was elected as their headperson. During its fourteen-year span, many rallies were held.

See also
 Taipei Community Services Center (offers support services to the international community)

References

 Chinese link

External links
Culture Taiwan article
Crystal Dragon of Taiwan (CDOT)

Cultural organizations based in Taiwan
1921 establishments in Taiwan